Brian David Teacher (born December 23, 1954) is a former American professional male tennis player.  He reached a career-high ranking World No. 7 in 1981.

Teacher is best remembered for his singles championship at the Australian Open in 1980. His career-high world singles ranking was No. 7 and his world doubles ranking was No. 5, both in 1981. He won 8 career singles titles, and 16 doubles titles.

Following his playing career, he became an ATP & WTA touring coach. He currently runs the Brian Teacher Tennis Academy in South Pasadena, California.

Early and personal life
Teacher was born in San Diego, California. He attended Crawford High School in San Diego, graduating in 1972. He later lived in Beverly Hills, California.

In 1979 he married fellow Californian player Kathy May, also a Top 10 tennis player, and the great-granddaughter of David May, founder of The May Department Stores Company (now Macy's). They subsequently divorced. He later studied for his MBA at the USC Marshall School of Business.

Tennis career

Junior, high school, and college
Teacher won a CIF singles title in 1972 while at Crawford High School.

In 1972, he won the boys' 18 singles and doubles titles. At the University of California-Los Angeles, where he studied economics, he won the Pacific-8 singles and doubles championship in 1974, was an All-American from 1973–76, and was a member of the UCLA teams that won the NCAA championship in 1975 and 1976.

Professional career
He reached the finals in  the South Australian and New South Wales Opens in 1977. In 1978, at the Seiko World Super Tennis Tournament in Tokyo, Teacher upset UCLA graduates Jimmy Connors and Arthur Ashe before losing in the final to Björn Borg 6–3, 6–4.

In 1980, he won the Australian Open, becoming the second Jewish player to win a men's Grand Slam Singles event (after Dick Savitt). He won the final over Kim Warwick of Australia in straight sets. With his Grand Slam victory, Teacher is one of only five American male players in the Open era to have won a single Grand Slam event (along with Michael Chang, Vitas Gerulaitis, Andy Roddick, and Roscoe Tanner).  Seven more Americans have more than one Slam (Stan Smith, Arthur Ashe, Jim Courier, Jimmy Connors, Andre Agassi, John McEnroe, and Pete Sampras).

His career-high world singles ranking was No. 7 and his world doubles ranking was No. 5, both in 1981.

He won 8 career singles titles, and 16 doubles titles.

Halls of fame
Teacher was inducted in 2001 into the Intercollegiate Tennis Association (ITA) Hall of Fame, in 2008 into the San Diego Tennis Hall of Fame, and he is also a member of the NCAA Tennis Hall of Fame and the Southern California Jewish Sports Hall of Fame. In 2014 he was inducted into the International Jewish Sports Hall of Fame. In 2015, Teacher was inducted into the Southern California Tennis Association Hall of Fame.

Coach
Following his playing career, he became an ATP & WTA touring coach working with, among others, Andre Agassi and Greg Rusedski. Under his tutelage, Rusedski made a run from #85 in the world to the top ten and the U.S. Open finals. Teacher also coached world #1 doubles players Jim Grabb, Richey Reneberg, Daniel Nestor, and Max Mirnyi. On the women's side, he coached WTA tour player Marissa Irvin. He currently runs the Brian Teacher Tennis Academy in South Pasadena, California.

Grand Slam finals

Singles (1 win)

Career finals

Singles (8 titles, 15 runners-up)

Doubles (16 titles, 8 runners-up)

Grand Slam tournament performance timeline

 The 1972 US Open had a preliminary round before the 128 player draw began.

Miscellaneous
After he retired he completed his undergraduate economics degree and studied business at the University of Southern California.
As a coach, he worked with Jim Grabb, Mark Knowles, Max Mirnyi, Daniel Nestor, Richey Reneberg, and Greg Rusedski.
He is married and has two children.

See also
List of select Jewish tennis players

Notes

References

External links
 
 
 Brian Teacher Tennis Academy

 

1954 births
Living people
American male tennis players
Australian Open (tennis) champions
Jewish American sportspeople
Jewish tennis players
Sportspeople from Omaha, Nebraska
Tennis players from San Diego
UCLA Bruins men's tennis players
Marshall School of Business alumni
Grand Slam (tennis) champions in men's singles
21st-century American Jews